Bangladeshi may refer to:

Person associated with Bangladesh 
 Bengalis 
 Bangladeshis
 Demographics of Bangladesh
 List of Bangladeshis

Other 
 Languages of Bangladesh
 Bangladeshi cuisine

See also 
 Bangladesh (disambiguation)
 Culture of Bangladesh